Santiago de Figueiró is a former civil parish, located in the municipality of Amarante, Portugal. In 2013, the parish merged into the new parish Figueiró (Santiago e Santa Cristina).

References

Former parishes of Portugal
Freguesias of Amarante, Portugal